Proaza is a municipality in the Autonomous Community of the Principality of Asturias, Spain. It is bordered on the north by Santo Adriano and Grado, on the south by Teverga and Quirós, on the west by Yernes y Tameza and Teverga, and on the east by Quirós.

Parroquias
The capital of the municipality of Proaza is the parish with the same name.

Natural wonders
 Caldoveiro Peak

References

External links
Federación Asturiana de Concejos 
Concejo de Proaza, informacion de turismo 

Municipalities in Asturias